Robert Peckham may refer to:

Robert Peckham (artist) (1785–1877), American portrait painter
Robert Francis Peckham (1920–1993), United States District Judge for California
Robert Peckham (historian)